Guéyo is a town in south-western Ivory Coast. It is a sub-prefecture of and the seat of Guéyo Department in Nawa Region, Bas-Sassandra District. Guéyo is also a commune.

In 2014, the population of the sub-prefecture of Guéyo was 39,213.

Villages
The nineteen villages of the sub-prefecture of Guéyo and their population in 2014 are:

References

Sub-prefectures of Nawa Region
Communes of Nawa Region